John Anderson Brooks (June 3, 1836 – February 3, 1897) was a religious scholar and prohibitionist who served as the Prohibition Party's vice presidential nominee during the 1888 presidential election.

Life

John Anderson Brooks was born on June 3, 1836, in Mason County, Kentucky to John Thomas Brooks and Elizabeth Branch Anderson. He graduated from Bethany College in Virginia in 1856. In 1877, he moved to Mexico where he was a pastor until 1880 when he returned to the United States and became a pastor in Kansas City from 1888 to 1892.

Before the Civil War, in which he served as a Confederate chaplain, he was a member of the Whig Party, but afterwards joined the Democratic Party. He later joined the Prohibition Party and served as its Missouri gubernatorial nominee in 1884 and as its vice presidential nominee in 1888.

In 1892, he moved to Memphis, but in 1894 he moved to London and served as a pastor until he returned to Memphis in 1896. On February 3, 1897, he died in Memphis, Tennessee from heart failure and his body was later moved and buried in Kansas City, Missouri.

References

1836 births
1897 deaths
People from Mason County, Kentucky
People from Sedalia, Missouri
20th-century American politicians
American temperance activists
Missouri Prohibitionists
People of Kentucky in the American Civil War
Bethany College (West Virginia) alumni
Prohibition Party (United States) vice presidential nominees
1888 United States vice-presidential candidates